The following tables indicate the party of elected officials in the U.S. state of Oklahoma:
Governor
Lieutenant Governor
Secretary of State
Attorney General
State Auditor, State Examiner and Inspector, and State Auditor and Inspector
State Treasurer
Superintendent of Public Instruction
Commissioner of Labor
Commissioner of Insurance

The tables also indicate the historical party composition in the:
State Senate
State House of Representatives
State Corporation Commission
State delegation to the U.S. Senate
State delegation to the U.S. House of Representatives

For years in which a presidential election was held, the tables indicate which party's nominees received the state's electoral votes.

1907–1978

1979–present

See also
 Law and government in Oklahoma
 Politics of Oklahoma
 Elections in Oklahoma
 Government of Oklahoma

References

Politics of Oklahoma
Government of Oklahoma
Oklahoma